BE Camelopardalis is a solitary variable star in the northern circumpolar constellation of Camelopardalis. It is visible to the naked eye as a faint, red-hued point of light with an apparent visual magnitude that fluctuates around 4.39. The star is located roughly 800 light years away from the Sun based on stellar parallax. 

This object is an M-type bright giant with a stellar classification of M2 II, and is currently on the asymptotic giant branch. It is classified as an irregular variable of subtype Lc and its brightness varies from magnitude +4.35 down to +4.48. Having exhausted the supply of hydrogen at its core, the star has expanded to around 176 times the Sun's radius. It has 2.9 times the Sun's mass and is radiating over four thousand times the luminosity of the Sun from its enlarged photosphere at an effective temperature of 3,615 K.

References

M-type bright giants
Asymptotic-giant-branch stars
Slow irregular variables

Camelopardalis (constellation)
Durchmusterung objects
023475
017884
1155
Camelopardalis, BE